Jorunna is a genus of sea slugs, dorid nudibranchs, shell-less marine gastropod molluscs in the family Discodorididae.

Biology
Jorunna species are usually camouflaged to match the sponges they feed on, which in many cases belong to the family Chalinidae. It is likely that many undescribed species exist.

Species 
There are more than 20 species in genus Jorunna.

Species brought into synonymy
 Jorunna johnstoni (Alder & Hancock, 1845): synonym of Jorunna tomentosa (Cuvier, 1804) - type species of the genus Jorunna
 Jorunna lemchei Ev. Marcus, 1976 : synonym of Gargamella lemchei (Ev. Marcus, 1976)
 Jorunna luisae Ev. Marcus, 1976: synonym of Jorunna evansi (Eliot, 1906)
 Jorunna malcolmi Ev. Marcus, 1976: synonym of Jorunna labialis (Eliot, 1908)
 Jorunna marchadi Risbec, 1956: synonym of Asteronotus cespitosus van Hasselt, 1824
 Jorunna zania Ev. Marcus, 1976: synonym of Jorunna funebris (Kelaart, 1859)

References

 Valdés Á. (2002). A phylogenetic analysis and systematic revision of the cryptobranch dorids (Mollusca, Nudibranchia, Anthobranchia). Zoological Journal of the Linnean Society. 136: 535-636

Discodorididae